What's the Matter with Kansas may refer to:

 What's the Matter with Kansas? (editorial), an 1896 newspaper editorial by William Allen White
 What's the Matter with Kansas? (book), a 2004 political book by Thomas Frank
 What's the Matter with Kansas? (film), a 2009 documentary based on the book